Artur Kukk (22 June 1899 – 19 April 1958) was an Estonian wrestler. He competed in the Greco-Roman heavyweight event at the 1920 Summer Olympics.

References

External links
 

1899 births
1958 deaths
Sportspeople from Tallinn
People from the Governorate of Estonia
Estonian male sport wrestlers
Olympic wrestlers of Estonia
Wrestlers at the 1920 Summer Olympics